Little Bill is an animated television series based on a Bill Cosby book series of the same name.

Little Bill may also refer to:

People
Bill Gaither (blues musician) (1910–1970), US blues guitarist and singer
Bill Johnston (tennis) (1894–1946), US tennis player unofficially co-ranked world number 1 in 1919 and 1922 
Bill Raidler (c. 1870–1904), US Old West outlaw and member of the Doolin-Dalton Gang
Bill Sowders (1864–1951), US Major League Baseball pitcher
Bill Standifer (1853–1903), US Old West gunman and lawman

Other uses
Little Bill, villain of the 1992 Western film Unforgiven, played by Gene Hackman
Mount Little Bill, a mountain in Victoria, Australia (see Deddick River)

See also
Big Bill (disambiguation)
Bill (disambiguation)

Lists of people by nickname